Strychnos tetragona is a species of plant in the Loganiaceae family. It is endemic to Sri Lanka.

References

tetragona
Critically endangered plants
Endemic flora of Sri Lanka
Trees of Sri Lanka
Taxonomy articles created by Polbot